The Shatoy ambush (known in Russia as the Battle of Yarysh-mardy) was an April 16, 1996, attack by forces of the Arab-born commander Ibn al-Khattab near the town of Shatoy in the southern mountains of Chechnya, during the First Chechen War.

Battle
The attack wrecked the column of the Russian 2nd Battalion from the 245th Motor Rifle Regiment (MRR) and killed 53 servicemen and injured 52, according to the official Russian figures. The first reports by the officials spoke of only 26 killed and 51 wounded. According to the other sources, more than 70 to almost 100 to even 223 soldiers of the 245th MRR died in the ambush. A few civilians who were traveling with the convoy were also reportedly killed.<ref name="amina">Did NSA Help Russia Target Dudayev? , CovertAction Quarterly, No. 61</ref>

According to the second-hand account by the Polish volunteer Mirosław Kuleba (aka Władysław Wilk/Mehmed Borz), Khattab's detachment of 43 men chose a "perfect ambush spot" with a ravine and a stream on one side and a forested slope on the other side of a serpentine mountain road: the rebels first let the Russian recon squad through and then detonated an IED under the leading tank; simultaneously, a volley of RPGs hit the unit's command vehicle, killing the Russian commander instantly, and the APC at the end the column - after this, the Chechens opened fire on the rest of the Russian unit. Kuleba wrote that the three-hour attack burned 27 armoured vehicles and trucks in the convoy and just 12 out of 199 Russian soldiers survived "the slaughter", while the rebel losses were only three killed and six wounded.

According to the Russian book Chechenskiy Kapkan'', up to 100 fighters ambushed the column of 30 Russian armoured vehicles, almost 100 soldiers were killed and "only eight escaped with their lives".

Aftermath
A video of the ambush, which shows the Russians were under the feet of the mujahideen, widely distributed and celebrated in Chechnya, featured Khattab "walking triumphantly down a line of blackened Russian corpses", and gained him early fame in Chechnya and great notoriety in Russia. The images of carnage also caused new calls for Russia's defence minister Pavel Grachev to resign, while Russia suspended its limited troop withdrawal.

References

External links
 Video of the ambush and the aftermath 
  Death of the 245th Regiment (report by Lev Rokhlin for the State Duma)

Battles involving Chechnya
1996 in Russia
Terrorist incidents in Russia in 1996
Attacks in 1996
Battles of the First Chechen War